The city of Dallas, Texas (USA) is home to many areas, neighborhoods, and communities.  The following is a list of neighborhoods placed within larger areas and sometimes communities.

For clarity, Dallas can be divided into several geographical areas which include macroneighborhoods, i.e., larger geographical sections of territory including many subdivisions or neighborhoods.

References

Further reading
 Nicholson, Eric. "A New Map of Blight in Dallas Highlights the Depth of City's North-South Divide." Dallas Observer. Friday July 12, 2013.

 
Neighborhoods
Dallas